Warehouse Row Historic District is a national historic district located at Cape Girardeau, Cape Girardeau County, Missouri.  The district encompasses three contributing buildings built between 1864 and 1874 alongside the banks of the Mississippi River in downtown Cape Girardeau. The buildings are all constructed of brick.

It was listed on the National Register of Historic Places in 2004.

References

Historic districts on the National Register of Historic Places in Missouri
Commercial buildings on the National Register of Historic Places in Missouri
Historic districts in Cape Girardeau County, Missouri
National Register of Historic Places in Cape Girardeau County, Missouri